Sjöstads IF is a floorball club in Karlstad, Sweden, established in 1977 as a soccer club. In 1984 the floorball section was started, and the soccer section was later disestablished. During 1990s, both the men's and the women's teams played in the Swedish top division. The women's team even won the 1993–1994 Swedish national championship.

From the 2001–2002 season, the club became inactive, and instead played floorball together with IBF NB 87 under the name Karlstads IBF. From the 2005–2006, Sjöstads IF as a club returned.

References

External links
Men's floorball team 
Women's floorball team 

1977 establishments in Sweden
Defunct football clubs in Sweden
Sport in Karlstad
Swedish floorball teams
Sports clubs established in 1977